Andri Abubakar (born 7 November 1988) is an Indonesian professional footballer who plays as a winger for Liga 3 club Tiga Naga.

Club career

PSPS Riau
He was signed for PSPS Riau to play in Liga 2 in the 2018 season.

Persiraja Banda Aceh
He was signed for Persiraja Banda Aceh to play in the middle season of Liga 2 in 2018.

Return to PSPS Riau
On 18 August 2021, Andri signed a contract with Indonesian Liga 2 club PSPS Riau. He made his league debut on 6 October against Semen Padang at the Gelora Sriwijaya Stadium, Palembang.

Honours

Club
Persiraja Banda Aceh
 Liga 2 third place (play-offs): 2019

References

External links
 Andri Abubakar at Soccerway
 Andri Abubakar at Liga Indonesia

1988 births
Living people
Indonesian footballers
PSPS Riau players
Association football forwards
People from Ternate
Sportspeople from North Maluku